Kadampanad Bhagavathy Temple is a Hindu temple situated at Kadampanad in Pathanamthitta district, Kerala, India. It is 12 km from Adoor , 6.6 km from Mannady and 10 km from Sasthamkotta. 
The deities worshiped in the temple are Sree Bhadra Devi, Sree Dharmashasthavu and Sree Durga Devi. The annual festival comes in the month of April (Meenam). It is a 10-day festival which starts with a holy flag hoisting and ends with a flag lowering. On the 10th day of the festival there is an aaraattu, a holy bath for Devi and Shasthavu, which includes a huge procession with many elephants.

The temple is managed by karayogam no. 232 (a local unit) of the Nair Service Society (NSS).

Hindu temples in Pathanamthitta district
Bhagavathi temples in Kerala